Spartan Scout, an Advanced Concept Technology Demonstration, is a crewless surface watercraft, also known as an unmanned surface vehicle (USV) developed by the United States in 2001, and first demonstrated in late 2003. It has a .50 caliber machine gun, as well as various sensors such as electro-optical and infrared surveillance and surface search radar. The Spartan is capable of carrying a  payload. According to a press release from the United States Navy, the Spartan Scout will also come in a  version, capable of carrying a  payload.

Although a two-man boat crew is needed to deploy the Spartan Scout, once deployed it is capable of working autonomously or semi-autonomously. During its demonstration deployment, the Spartan Scout was configured for surface surveillance and force protection, although it can potentially be configured for more complex missions.

References

Sources

Unmanned surface vehicles of USA
Vehicles introduced in 2003